Greg Natale (born 1974) is an Australian interior designer, and the founder of Greg Natale Design.

Early life and education
Natale was born and raised in Sydney, Australia, to Italian immigrants who arrived in Australia in the 1950s. Natale took a three-year course in interior design at the Enmore Design Centre at TAFE NSW – Sydney Institute, studied visual arts at Sydney College of the Arts, and architecture at the University of Technology, Sydney.

Career
From 1996 to 2001, Natale worked for three different architectural design firms: Garth Barnett Designers, HBO+EMTB, and SJB. In 2001, he launched Greg Natale Design. This was around the end of the minimalism movement, and Natale chose to pursue a more luxurious look than had previously been in style. His first major project was the 2002 design of the Gonano Apartment, with a decorative, repeat pattern coordinated on walls, blinds, bed linens and art.

Natale's first book, The Tailored Interior, was published by Hardie Grant in November 2014, with photography by Anson Smart and a foreword by Jonathan Adler. The book offers insights and lessons on interior design, including Natale's philosophies and approach to paint color, type of paints, patterns, proportion, cohesion and layering, showcasing 18 spaces Natale has created. Architectural Digest named the book as part of its 21 Best Books by Designers and Architects of 2015.

In September 2018 Natale's second book, The Patterned Interior, was published by Rizzoli New York.

Bibliography
 The Tailored Interior (Hardie Grant Books, 2014)
The Patterned Interior (Rizzoli, New York, 2018)

Television
 homeMADE, Nine Network, season 1, 2009
 The Renovators, Network Ten, season 1, 2011

References

External links
 Official website
 Greg Natale Rugs

Living people
1974 births
Australian interior designers
People from Sydney
University of Technology Sydney alumni